Paolo Matthiae (born 1940) is an Italian archaeologist.

He is a professor of History of Art of the Ancient Near East in the University of Rome La Sapienza; he has been Director of the Ebla Expedition since 1963—in fact, its discoverer—and has published many articles and books about Ebla and about the History of Art of Mesopotamia and Syria in general. In 1972 and 1973, Matthiae co-directed the excavation of Tell Fray in the Euphrates Valley that was to be flooded by Lake Assad, the reservoir of the Tabqa Dam which was being constructed at that time. He is a member of institutions as the Accademia Nazionale dei Lincei (Rome), the Academie des Inscriptions et Belles-Lettres and the Deutsches Archaeologisches Institut, and is doctor Honoris Causa of the Autonomous University of Madrid.

Books 
Ebla: An Empire Rediscovered
Ebla: La città rivelata, collection «Universale Electa/Gallimard●Storia e civiltà» (nº 56), Electa/Gallimard, 1995
Aux origines de la Syrie : Ebla retrouvée, collection « Découvertes Gallimard / Archéologie » (nº 276), Éditions Gallimard, 1996

References 

1940 births
Living people
Italian archaeologists
Academic staff of the Sapienza University of Rome
Ebla